Kamakshipalya Gopalaiah is an Indian politician serving as the Minister of Excise of Karnataka from 21 January 2021. He was elected to the Karnataka Legislative Assembly from Mahalakshmi Layout in the 2018 Karnataka Legislative Assembly election as a member of Janata Dal (Secular). Later, he joined the Bharatiya Janata Party in 2019 and won the by-elections same year.

References

1961 births
Living people
Janata Dal (Secular) politicians
Bharatiya Janata Party politicians from Karnataka
People from Bangalore
Karnataka MLAs 2018–2023